The Council of the Bishops' Conferences of Europe (CCEE) is a conference of the presidents of the 33 Roman Catholic episcopal conferences of Europe, the Archbishop of Luxembourg, the Archbishop of Monaco, Maronite Catholic Archeparch of Cyprus, the Roman Catholic Bishop of Chişinău, the Ruthenian Catholic Eparch of Mukacheve, and the Apostolic Administrator of Estonia.

The president is Archbishop Gintaras Grušas, Archbishop of Vilnius. The vice-presidents are Cardinal Jean-Claude Hollerich, Archbishop of Luxembourg, and Bishop László Német, Bishop of Zrenjanin. The general secretary of CCEE is Father Martin Michalíček.

The offices of the  Secretariat are located in St. Gallen, Switzerland.

Presidents

Conferences 
 Episcopal Conference of Albania
 Episcopal Conference of Austria
 Episcopal Conference of Belarus
 Episcopal Conference of Belgium
 Episcopal Conference of Bosnia and Herzegovina
 Episcopal Conference of Bulgaria
 Episcopal Conference of Croatia
 Episcopal Conference of the Czech Republic
 Episcopal Conference of England and Wales
 Episcopal Conference of Ireland
 Episcopal Conference of Germany
 Episcopal Conference of Greece
 Episcopal Conference of Hungary
 Episcopal Conference of France
 Episcopal Conference of Italy
 Episcopal Conference of Malta
 Episcopal Conference of the Netherlands
 Episcopal Conference of Poland
 Episcopal Conference of Portugal
 Episcopal Conference of Romania
 Episcopal Conference of Scandinavia
 Episcopal Conference of Scotland
 Episcopal Conference of Serbia
 Episcopal Conference of Slovakia
 Episcopal Conference of Slovenia
 Episcopal Conference of Spain
 Swiss Bishop's Conference
 Episcopal Conference of the Ukraine
 Episcopal Conference of Latvia
 Episcopal Conference of Lithuania
 Episcopal Conference of Russia
 Episcopal Conference of Turkey

General Secretaries

See also
 Catholic Church in Europe
List of Catholic dioceses in Europe
 St. Gallen Group

References

External links

Europe Council
Catholic Church in Europe
International organizations based in Europe
Organisations based in St. Gallen (city)